Comley is a surname. Notable people with the name include:

Bonnie Comley, American screen producer, writer and performer
James Comley (born 1991), English soccer player
John M. Comley (1895–1974), Justice of the Connecticut Supreme Court
Kathleen Comley, British Paralympic archer
Larry Comley (1939–2006), American professional basketball player
Rick Comley (born 1947), American collegiate ice hockey player and head coach

See also
Conley